Ackerson Mountain is a summit in Tuolumne County, California, in the United States.

Ackerson Mountain was named in honor of James F. Ackerson, a figure in the California Gold Rush.

References

Mountains of Tuolumne County, California
Mountains of Northern California